The Ikere Gorge Dam is a major earth-fill dam in Iseyin local government area of Oyo State in the south west of Nigeria on the Ogun River.
Reservoir capacity is 690 million m3.
The dam was initiated by the military regime of General Olusegun Obasanjo and started in 1983 by the administration of Shehu Shagari. The dam was planned to generate 37.5 MW of electricity, to supply  water to local communities and to Lagos and to irrigate 12,000 hectares of land. Built in 1982/1983, work on the dam was abandoned by subsequent military governments.
A report for the UN in 2004 said that no irrigation had taken place so far, but efforts were being made to implement one of the five planned irrigation projects. The project was based on the sprinkler system which is difficult to manage and requires that the farmers be trained.

References

Dams in Nigeria
Oyo State
Earth-filled dams
Dams completed in 1983
20th-century architecture in Nigeria